Pierdomenico Baccalario (born 6 March 1974) is an Italian author of children's and young adult fiction, best known for his Ulysses Moore series that sold more than 10 million copies worldwide.

Biography
Pierdomenico Baccalario was born in Acqui Terme, Italy, in 1974. He studied law in university, but he continued to write, a passion that he had had since high school, and published his first book, ′′La strada del guerriero′′ in 1999. The book was popular in Italy but was never translated into English. 

In 2004 he published the first of so far 18 novels in the Ulysses Moore series, which has since been translated in 29 languages and sold 10 million copies worldwide.

Baccalario lives part time in Italy and part time in London with his wife Marina Della Giusta, a professor of economy at the University of Reading, andt their two daughters. He is the founder of Book on a Tree, a company with some 15 employees, publishing 60 books a year.

In 2019 he was shortlisted for the Premio Strega for author's writing for children (age 11+).

Bibliography

Novels

Stand-alone novels
 La Strada del Guerriero (Piemme)
 L'ombra del corvo (Piemme)
 La Bibbia in 365 racconti (2004) (Paoline)
 La mosca di rame (2005) (Paoline)
 I mastrodonti (2006) (Paoline)
 Pesci Volanti (with Elena Peduzzi) (2007) (Fanucci)
 Amaro dolce Amore (with Elena Peduzzi) (2008) (Fanucci)
 Il principe della città di sabbia (with Enzo d'Alò and Gaston Kaborè) (2008) (Arnoldo Mondadori Editore)
 Il popolo di Tarkaan (2009) (Piemme)
 La bambina che leggeva i libri (2010) (Fanucci)
 Il Codice dei Re (2010) (Piemme)
 Lo spacciatore di fumetti (2011) (Einaudi)
 Maydala Express (with Davide Morosinotto) (2011) (Piemme)
 La vera storia di Capitan Uncino (2011) (Piemme)

La Clessidra
Published by De Agostini.
2002: Verso la nuova frontiera
2002: Al di là degli oceani
2002: Il mistero dell'Everest
2002: Il Signore dell'Orda
2003: La fortezza degli angeli
2004: La regina della tavola rotonda

Ulysses Moore
Published by Piemme. English translation published by Scholastic.
2004: The Door to Time
2005: The Long-Lost Map
2005: The House of Mirrors
2006: The Isle of Masks
2006: The Stone Guardians
2007: The First Key
2008: The Hidden City
2009: The Lord of the Ray
2009: The Shadow Labyrinth
2010: The Ice Land
2010: The Ash Garden
2011: The Imaginary Travelers
2013: The Boat of Time
2014: The Journey to the Dark Harbours
2014: The Pirates of the Imaginary Sea
2015: The Island of Rebels'''
2016: The Battle of Time2016: The Great SummerCandy Circle
Collaboration with Alessandro Gatti; published by Arnoldo Mondadori Editore.
2005: Pronti... partenza... crash!2005: Attenti al guru!2005: Salsicce e misteri2005: Tutti addosso al drago rosso!2005: Quando il bomber fa cilecca...2005: Pecore alla deriva2006: Faccia di menta2006: Chi ha paura del Candy Circle?2006: Paura a Gravenstein Castle2008: Il tempio degli scorpioni di smeraldoCentury
Published by Piemme. English translation published by Random House.
2006: Ring of Fire (it. L'anello di fuoco)
2007: Star of Stone (it. La stella di pietra)
2007: City of Wind (it. La città del vento)
2008: Dragon of Seas (it. La prima sorgente)

Will Moogley Agenzia Fantasmi
Published by Piemme.
2008: Hotel a cinque spettri2008: Una famiglia... da brivido2009: Il fantasma del grattacielo2009: Anche i fantasmi tremano2009: Un mostro a sorpresa2010: Il re del brivido2010: Terrore in casa TupperI gialli di vicolo Voltaire
Collaboration with Alessandro Gatti; published by Piemme.
2009: Un bicchiere di veleno2009: Non si uccide un grande mago2010: Lo strano caso del ritratto fiammingo2010: Vacanza con delitto2010: La baronessa nel baule2011: Il mistero del quaderno cinese2011: Lo scheletro sotto il tettoCyboria
Published by De Agostini.
2009: Cyboria. Il risveglio di Galeno2011: Cyboria. Ultima fermata: Fine del mondo2013: Cyboria. Il re dei lumiLa Bottega Battibaleno
Published by Piemme.
2012: Una valigia di stelle2012: La bussola dei sogni2013: La mappa dei passaggiI Classicini
Rewrites of classical novels, published by Edizioni EL.
 L'isola del tesoro (Treasure Island)
 Il richiamo della foresta (The Call of the Wild)

Anthologies
2009: Sanctuary (Asengard Editore)

Non-fiction
 Passaggio a Nord-Est, La vita avventurosa di Giacomo Bove (with Andrea Canobbio)
 Focus, Le più incredibili curiosità sugli animali (Mondadori)
 Focus, Invenzioni e scienziati pazzi (Mondadori)
 Focus, Mostri e creature orripilanti (Mondadori)
 Focus, Tesori perduti (Mondadori)
 Focus, Le più incredibili curiosità della natura selvaggia (Mondadori)
 Focus Junior. Tutti i più incredibili misteri dell'universo (Mondadori)

Screenplays
 Zombie Family (Pixel Dna)
 Candy Circle'' pilot episode (with Alessandro Gatti and Enzo d'Alò)

Notes

Living people
Italian male writers
1974 births
People from Acqui Terme